Forum for Young Canadians is a non-partisan program for youth aged 15–19 founded by The Foundation for the Study of Processes of Government in Canada in Ottawa, Ontario. In March 1976 the first sessions of Forum were launched. The Forum for Young Canadians provides students with an opportunity to learn more about the importance of public affairs and how they can proactively be a voice in helping others understand Canadian politics in relation to the world around them.

Program Details 

Forum runs for three sessions during February and March of each year. Each session is a week long experience which includes various behind the scenes activities in Canada’s capital city including: 
 Senate and House of Commons experiences
 Meeting various political leaders such as Members of Parliament, and Senators
 Participate in role-play based simulations such as National Election, International Trade and Ministerial Cabinet

The learning program begins before the students arrive at Forum for the week long program. Students are encouraged to learn about current affairs that interest them in order to bring their ideas, opinions and insights to share with other students. The learning program continues after they depart from Ottawa, giving students an opportunity to further connect with their own community based on what they have learned, creating a learning environment for others around them.

Forum encourages students to proactively seek out sponsors or fund-raise to aid them in covering the costs of the program. The fees cover meals for the entire week, accommodations and transportation. Bursaries are also available.

Forum provides an opportunity for high school and Cégep students who want to further their leadership skills, learn about the political, social and cultural issues impacting their country and communities and create friendships with other young, passionate students throughout Canada.

References

External links 

Canadian House of Commons Page Program

Canadian Senate Page Program

Foundation for the Study of Processes of Government in Canada

See also 
 http://forum.ca/
 http://www.pch.gc.ca/eng/1376910649021

Bibliography 
Bunnell, Eric. "Parkside Collegiate Institute in St. Thomas Sending Three Students to Forum for Young Canadians." St. Thomas Times-Journal 25 Feb. 2014, News Local sec. St. Thomas Times-Journal. Web. 13 May 2015. <http://www.stthomastimesjournal.com/2014/02/25/parkside-collegiate-institute-in-st-thomas-sending-three-students-to-forum-for-young-canadians>.

"Forum for Young Canadians". Foundation for the Study of Processes of Government in Canada. 2014. Print.

"Foundation For The Study Of Processes Of Government In Canada-fondation Pour L'etude Des Processurs De Government Au Canada." Foundation For The Study Of Processes Of Government In Canada-fondation Pour L'etude Des Processurs De Government Au Canada. OpenCharity. Web. 13 May 2015. http://www.opencharity.ca/charity/118929454RR0001

German, Tony. "Chapter 18: The Forum for Young Canadians." A Character of Its Own: Ashbury College 1891-1991. Carp: Creative Bound, 1991. 203-208. Print. "History of the Foundation | Forum." Forum: History of the Foundation. Forum for Young Canadians. Web. 12 May 2015. <http://forum.ca/about-us/history-of-the-foundation/>.

Huffman, Alexa. "Wembley Students Enjoy Ottawa Experience." Grande Prairie Daily Herald-Tribune 17 Mar. 2015. Daily Herald Tribune. Web. 13 May 2015. <https://web.archive.org/web/20150421234801/http://www.dailyheraldtribune.com/2015/03/17/wembley-students-enjoy-ottawa-experience>

"Looking Back 40 Years: 1975-2015." Ottawa: Forum for Young Canadians, 2015. Print.

"Newsletter." Forum for Young Canadians (2014). Print.

Educational organizations based in Ontario